Saint-Béat (Gascon: Sent Biat) is a former commune in the Haute-Garonne department in southwestern France. On 1 January 2019, it was merged into the new commune Saint-Béat-Lez.

Sites and monuments
 Château de Saint-Béat, 12th century castle
 The Pic du Gar is a striking limestone mountain in the area.

Population

See also
Communes of the Haute-Garonne department

References

Former communes of Haute-Garonne
Haute-Garonne communes articles needing translation from French Wikipedia
States and territories disestablished in 2019